All These Dreams is the second studio album by American musician Andrew Combs. It was released on 26 January 2015 in Europe through Loose, then released throughout the rest of the world in March 2015 under Coin Records.

Track listing

References

2015 albums
Andrew Combs albums
Loose Music albums